The European Microscopy Society is an international learned society which represents the field of microscopy in Europe. It was founded in 1998 following the disbanding of the Committee of European Societies of Electron Microscopy (which was founded in 1976) as a union of national microscopical societies. The society acts as a regional committee of the International Federation of Societies for Microscopy.

Member societies
Listed below are the bodies which are members of the EMS. All those listed have reciprocal membership agreements. The society has 52 corporate members (ECMA) and 37 individual members, with 28 member countries.

National bodies
Armenian Electron Microscopy Society (AEMS)	
Austrian Society for Electron Microscopy (ASEM)	
Belgian Society for Microscopy (BSM)	
Croatian Microscopy Society (CMS)	
Czechoslovak Microscopy Society (CSMS)	
Dutch Society for Microscopy (NVvM)	
Electron Microscopy and Analysis Group (Institute of Physics) (EMAG)
French Microscopy Society (SFµ)	
German Society for Electron Microscopy (DGE)	
Hellenic Microscopy Society (HMS)	
Hungarian Society for Microscopy (HSM)	
Israel Society for Microscopy (ISM)	
Italian Society of Microscopical Sciences (SISM)	
Microscopical Society of Ireland (MSI)	
Nordic Microscopy Society (SCANDEM)
Polish Society for Microscopy (PTMi)	
Portuguese Society for Microscopy (SPMicros)	
Romanian Electron Microscopy Society (REMS)	
Royal Microscopical Society (RMS)
Serbian Society for Microscopy (SSM)	
Slovene Society for Microscopy (SDM)	
Spanish Society for Microscopy (SME)	
Swiss Society for Optics and Microscopy (SSOM)	
Turkish Society for Electron Microscopy (TEMD)

Other societies
Bulgarian National Committee for Electron Microscopy
European Microbeam Analysis Society (EMAS)	
Greek Society of Electron Microscopy
Institute of Physics
Latvian Society for Electron Microscopy
Rumanian National Committee for Electron Microscopy
Russian Academy of Sciences
Scottish Microscopy Group (SMG)

References

External links
Official website
Microscience Microscopy Congress

 
International Federation of Societies for Microscopy
Royal Microscopical Society
Scientific societies based in France